Chryseofusus graciliformis is a species of sea snail, a marine gastropod mollusk in the family Fasciolariidae, the spindle snails, the tulip snails and their allies.

Description
The shell attains a length of 50.2 mm.

Distribution
This species occurs in the Indian Ocean off Somalia at a depth of 400 m.

References

 Hadorn R. & Fraussen K. (1999) Rediscovery of Fusinus subangulatus (von Martens, 1903) and description of a new Somalian Fusinus (Gastropoda: Fasciolariidae), including some notes on the taxonomical position of the genus Siphonofusus Kuroda & Habe, 1952. Vita Marina 46(3-4): 111–122

Endemic fauna of Somalia
Fasciolariidae
Gastropods described in 1880